Pilotis, or piers, are supports such as columns, pillars, or stilts that lift a building above ground or water. They are traditionally found in stilt and pole dwellings such as fishermen's huts in Asia and Scandinavia using wood, and in elevated houses such as Old Queenslanders in Australia's tropical Northern state, where they are called "stumps".

Function
In modern architecture, pilotis are ground-level supporting columns. A prime example is Le Corbusier's Villa Savoye in Poissy, France. Another is Patrick Gwynne's The Homewood in Surrey, England.

Beyond their support function, the pilotis (or piers) raise the architectural volume, lighten it and free a space for circulation under the construction. They refine a building's connectivity with the land by allowing for parking, garden or driveway below while allowing a sense of floating and lightness in the architecture itself.  In hurricane-prone areas, pilotis may be used to raise the inhabited space of a building above typical storm surge levels.

Le Corbusier used them in a variety of forms from slender posts to the massive Brutalist look of the Marseilles Housing Unit (1945–1952) with a range of bases, inclusions and surfaces. This was part of Le Corbusier's idea of machine-like efficiency where land, people and buildings would work together optimally.

Notes

References

Article: "Pilote, die" in: Pevsner, Honour, Fleming: Lexikon der Weltarchitektur, München 1987
 Primer on architecture of the Musée Picardie, accessed 2009-06-20
 "pilotis", The Urban Conservation Glossary, University of Dundee, online version accessed 2009-06-20

Architectural elements